Otto Hans Abt (June 9, 1903 in Binningen – October 1, 1982 in Basel) was a Swiss painter.

Life
Otto Abt was born in 1903 in Binningen in the Canton of Basel-Country in Switzerland.  He was the son of a doctor, he studied medicine at the University of Basel but broke off his study after two years and focused on his training as a painter at the trade school in Basel. There he came to know the painter Walter Kurt Wiemken and Walter Bodmer, with whom he maintained a lifelong friendship.  There followed, starting in 1927, a series of trips to Spain and southern France among other places as well as studying abroad in Paris, where he came into contact with Parisian avant-garde painting.  Through an examination of the works of Matisse, Picasso, and Dalí as well as his friendship with surrealist painter Serge Brignoni, he developed his own surrealist-influenced painting style.

In an effort to gain recognition for the modern, abstract-concrete and surrealist painting in Switzerland, Abt and several other painters from Basel founded the anti-fascist "Gruppe 33" (Group 33).  In 1936, he joined the alliance, a group of modern Swiss artists who campaigned for the propagation of non-representational art.  Abt spent the war years in Tessin.

Since the 1950s, Abt has undertaken a variety of artistic projects: in addition to canvas painting, murals and stained glass for public buildings, as well as Maiolica ceramics, and mosaics.  He also took part, along with other artists of the Gruppe 33, in the development and production of the "Basler Kunstlarven" (Basel Artistic Masks), highly decorated masks used in the Carnival of Basel. He is buried in a cemetery in Basel.

Works
Abt's rejection of fascism and his tendency toward social criticism are reflected in many of his works.  While his early works were marked by impressionist influences and even tonal painting, he developed his own surrealist-influenced style that can be recognized by object alienation and fantastic picture elements.  In his later years he returned to landscape scenes and still lifes.  His work has been shown in numerous galleries, primarily in Switzerland.

Selected works
 Vor Sonnenaufgang (Ceramic), 1934, Fountain decoration, Petersschule, Basel 
 Aurore (Painting), 1935, Kunstmuseum Basel
 Komposition (Mural), 1968, Spiegelfeld-Schule, Binningen
 Jahreszeiten (Stained Glass), 1974–76, Crematory of the Graveyard at Hörnli in Riehen
 Vorort im Winter (painting), 1969,

References
Otto Abt in the Historical Dictionary of Switzerland 
Otto Abt in the Dictionary of People of the Canton of Basel-Country 

20th-century Swiss painters
20th-century Swiss male artists
Swiss male painters
1903 births
1982 deaths